The Potosí School refers to 17th-century Baroque artworks from Potosí, the location of the Spanish colonial mint: "according to some accounts, the city was an art factory producing at least 200,000 paintings a year".

References

Buildings and structures in Potosí
Bolivian art
Baroque art